Kumo is a British musician and composer, the pseudonym of Jono Podmore who was born in 1965.

Biography
Kumo came into existence in 1994 when composer, producer, engineer and arranger Jono Podmore began work at Watershed Studios, London and with Plink Plonk records, founding two sister labels to Plink Plonk: Autoi and Psychomat. He began to play the theremin, developing new techniques for live performance of electronic music.

After a string of singles, remixes, live dates and international DJ commitments as Kumo, March 1997 saw the release of his first album Kaminari to significant critical acclaim.

1997 was also the year that Kumo moved temporarily to France to work with Irmin Schmidt (of Can) on his opera Gormenghast, which premiered in 1998 and was re-staged in 2004. A selection from the opera was released on Spoon/Mute records in 2000.

October 2000 saw the release of the second Kumo album 1+1=1 on Spoon Records.

In 2001, after extensive touring including the Sonar festival, the London Jazz Festival and the Can Solo Projects tour, the first Irmin Schmidt and Kumo album Masters of Confusion was released worldwide. Later the same year they created the sound installation Flies, Guys and Choirs for the Barbican Centre as part of the Elektronik festival. The installation is now available as a sonic experience for public spaces. The duo continue to perform and give workshops together across Europe and work on film and TV music together including award-winning German TV series and dramas.

The 4-track EP Kumo and Friends was released on Electric Tones Records in early 2003 and a successful collaboration with B. J. Cole was released on the album Trouble in Paradise.

After further live appearances together, work began on a second Irmin Schmidt and Kumo album and the duo also made remixes (including P.I.L); performed live, held workshops in Germany and Portugal; and produced the album dot i/o for Mito Ichikawa.

The second Irmin Schmidt and Kumo album, Axolotl Eyes, was released in Spring 2008 on Spoon/Mute/Warners and was set for release in Japan on P-Vine Autumn 2008. The seven-track album comes with a bonus DVD containing the complete sound installation Flies, Guys and Choirs in 5.1, accompanied by a two-hour film by Jono and Sandra Podmore with Kate Shipp. The DVD was screened at the Sonar Festival, Barcelona; Les Chants Mechaniques festival, Lille; and for the entire Short Circuit Festival, at The Roundhouse, London in May 2011.

A four-track Kumo EP entitled Metapolis was available on iTunes and further releases are planned.

In late 2009, Kumo founded a new and ongoing analogue electronic music collective Metamono. With critically praised analogue only releases and live events under their belt, the first vinyl release, Tape EP, was released on 23 January 2012.

Discography
 No Need: Autoi ep 01 1996
 Armed Response: Psychomat PSY 1 1997
 7 Buckets: Psychomat PSY 2 1997
 Together: Psychomat PSY 3 1997
 Kaminari: Psychomat PSYLP1 1997
 Kumo - 1+1=1: Spoon Records SPOON CD 46 2000
 Masters of Confusion (with Irmin Schmidt): Spoon Records SPOON CD 45 2001
 Kumo and Friends: Electric Tones Records e-tones 009 2003
 Metapolis (EP): iTunes/White Label Records 2007
 Axolotl Eyes (with Irmin Schmidt): Spoon Records CDSPOON48 2008
 Tape EP - Metamono: HoHum Records HOMUM017

References

External links
 Psychomat Records – Music and Sound Art since 1997
 Kumo Facebook Page
 KUMO | Listen and Stream Free Music, Albums, New Releases, Photos, Videos My Space Page
  Metapolis EP
 Kumo music, videos, stats, and photos

1965 births
British experimental musicians
British electronic musicians
Theremin players
British composers
Living people